The Messel Formation is a geologic formation in Hesse, central Germany, dating back to the Eocene epoch (about 47 Ma). Its geographic range is restricted to the Messel pit. There it unconformably overlies crystalline Variscan basement and its Permian cover (Rotliegend) as well as Eocene volcanic breccias derived from the basement rocks. The formation mainly comprises lacustrine laminated bituminous shale (‘oil shale’) renowned for its content of fossils in exceptional preservation, particularly plants, arthropods and vertebrates (e.g. Darwinius masillae).

See also

 List of fossiliferous stratigraphic units in Germany

References
 Krister T. Smith, Stephan F. K. Schaal, Jörg Habersetzer (eds). "Messel – An Ancient Greenhouse Ecosystem." Schweizerbart, Stuttgart 2018. .
 

Paleogene Germany